Berni Searle (born 7 July 1964 in Cape Town, South Africa) is an artist who works with photography, video, and film to produce lens-based installations that stage narratives connected to history, identity, memory, and place. Often politically and socially engaged, her work also draws on universal emotions associated with vulnerability, loss and beauty.

Searle lives and works in Cape Town, South Africa and is currently Associate Professor at the Michaelis School of Fine Art at the University of Cape Town.

Early life 
Searle was born on July 7, 1964 in Cape Town, South Africa to parents of African and German-English ancestry.  As a mixed race person growing up during apartheid in South Africa, Searle was categorized as "Coloured," a label that she later rejected and challenged through her art post-apartheid.

Education 
Searle received her BA in Fine Art in 1987 and a postgraduate diploma in Education in 1988 from the Michaelis School of Fine Art, University of Cape Town.

After graduating, Searle taught art in a Cape Town high school for two years and then re-entered Michaelis, registering for a master's degree in sculpture in 1992. While this was a valuable time for accumulating technical expertise and consolidating an affinity for the three-dimensional form - something that is still visible in her photographic works today -, her search for both form and content continued. Her body of work presented for the master's degree in fine art in 1995 shows abstract, voluminous structures in cement, ciment fondu, steel, wire, bronze, and glass that seem somehow incongruous with the much more intimate and lyrical works by which Searle is recognized today. Created a year after the first democratic elections, these works were meant to question euphoric ideals of nationhood and nation building in a lexicon strongly mediated, even regulated, by context and instruction.

Notable works 
Berni Searle utilizes large scale digital photographic prints, found materials, and time-based media such as film to capture her work. Searle's work encompasses performative narratives and the self as a figure to embody history, land, memory and place. Searle is known for utilizing her own body in her pieces to highlight her own bodily agency and to construct and deconstruct identities around race and gender. Spices are a common motif in her work.

Colour Me series 
Searle's series Colour Me is a body of work created between 1998 to 2000 for which she had herself photographed, her body outlined or adorned with different colored spices, to create life size or larger than life digital color prints. The colored spices allude to the racial classifications imposed under apartheid, and also the movement of both spices and slaves during colonial regimes. Many works in the Colour Me series also feature measuring tools, signifying the colonial, pseudoscientific gaze on black bodies. Her work deals with South African History, the awareness of one's own skin color, and the consumption of a woman's body as a commodity; the confrontational power of that same body in which so many myths, desires, and necessities reside.

Discoloured series 
With her installation A Darker Shade of Light (1999), Searle responds to the Truth and Reconciliation Commission, which was intended to bring justice to the victims of violent crimes that occurred in South Africa during the apartheid era. This work is made up of close-up photos of parts of Searle’s naked body - including images of the nape of the neck, the back, the palms, and the soles of the feet -, all of which are covered in henna powder to mimic the appearance of bruising. By altering the appearance of her body and positioning herself in ways that reference the victimization of women, Searle creates the types of images that many saw to be lacking in the testimonies at the TRC hearings. Thus, the work examines the issue of visibility with regard to trauma and the abuse of women.

A Place in the Sun 
Searle’s installation A Place in the Sun (2019) consists of four screens that play video of a drained swimming pool in the socially diverse Maitland community in Cape Town throughout the day. The video offers glimpses into the nostalgic feelings of residents of the community through the music and sounds of children playing over the desolate space as the artist and other figures occasionally pass in and out of the frame. As the scene shifts to nighttime, fire breaks out in the previously solemn setting while the ambient sounds of the community continue, eventually being overtaken by police sirens. Through this piece, Searle calls to attention the issues of insufficient funding and housing in communities like Maitland, as well as the political protests that had taken place in South Africa in recent years.

Awards
UNESCO/AICA Award at the Cairo Biennale (1998)
Minister of Culture prize at the Dak’art Biennale (2000)
Civitella Ranieri Fellowship (2001)
Standard Bank Young Artist Award (2003)
Rockefeller Bellagio Creative Arts Fellow (2014)

Nominations and shortlists
FNB VITA Art Award (2000)
Daimler-Chrysler Award for South African Contemporary Art (2000)
Artes Mundi award (2004)

Selected exhibitions

Solo exhibitions
1992: Passing Through, Canberra Gallery, Australian National University, Canberra, Australia
1999: Colour Me, Mark Coetzee Fine Art Cabinet, Cape Town, South Africa
2000: INOVA (Institute of the Visual Arts), University of Wisconsin, Wisconsin, United States
2011: Interlaced, De Hallen, the Belfry Tower, Bruges; Museum voor Moderne Kunst Arnhem (MMKA), Arnhem, Netherlands; Frac Lorraine, Metz, France (with new commissioned work)
2011: Shimmer, Stevenson Gallery, Cape Town
2012: Black Smoke Rising Trilogy, Ron Mandos gallery, Amsterdam, Netherlands
2013: Refuge, La Galerie Particuliere, Paris

Group exhibitions
1997: Life's Little Necessities, 2nd Johannesburg Biennale, The Castle, Cape Town, South Africa
7th International Cairo Biennale, Cairo, Egypt
1999: Staking Claims, The Granary, Cape Town, South Africa
1999: Postcards from South Africa, Axis Gallery, New York, United States
1999: Emergence, Traveling exhibition
1999: Truth Veils, Gertrude Posel Gallery, University of Witwatersrand, Johannesburg, South Africa
1999: Isintu: Ceremony, Identity, and Community, South African National Gallery, Johannesburg, South Africa
1999: Bloodlines/Bloedlyn, Klein Karoo Kunste Fees, Oudsthoorn, South Africa
2000: Dak'art 2000, Dakar, Senegal
2000: Insertion, Apex Gallery, New York, United States
2001: 49th Venice Biennale, Venice, Italy
2005: 51st Venice Biennale, Venice, Italy
2010-2011: Pictures by Women: A History of Modern Photography, Museum of Modern Art, New York City, New York, United States
2010–2011: The Dissolve, SITE Santa Fe, 8th International Biennial, Santa Fe, New Mexico
2011: Figures & Fictions: Contemporary South African Photography, Victoria and Albert Museum, London, 2011
2011: She Devil 5 Museum of Contemporary Art of Rome (MACRO), Rome, Italy
2012: The Human Condition, Bradbury Gallery, State University, Arkansas
2013: Terminal. As part of the program LAND, various locations across the City of Cape Town. Organized by GIPCA, curated by Jean Brundrit and Svea Josephy and Adrienne van Eeden Wharton
2014: Public Intimacy. Art and Other Ordinary Acts in South Africa, Yerba Buena Center for the Arts in conjunction with San Francisco Museum of Modern Art, San Francisco, CA
2014: Earth Matters, National Museum of African Art, Smithsonian Institution, Washington D.C.
2015: Distance and Desire: Encounters with the African Archive, The Walther Collection, Ulm, Germany. Curated by Tamar Garb
2019: Made Routes: Mapping and Making, Richard Saltoun Gallery, London, UK. Curated by Tamar Garb
2019: Yithi Laba. A group exhibition by Lindeka Qampi, Neo Ntsoma, Zanele Muholi, Ruth Seopedi Motau and Berni Searle at Market Photo Workshop, Johannesburg

References

Bibliography

External links

1964 births
Living people
20th-century South African women artists
21st-century South African artists
21st-century South African women artists
Artists from Cape Town
Michaelis School of Fine Art alumni
South African contemporary artists